Quandahl is an unincorporated community in Allamakee County, Iowa, United States.

History
 Quandahl was founded in the northwestern corner of the county; the community's post office opened in 1877 and closed in 1906.

Quandahl's population was 28 in 1902, and was 42 in 1925.

The community is adjacent to the Bear Creek Public Access area.

References

Unincorporated communities in Allamakee County, Iowa
Unincorporated communities in Iowa